The 2021–22 season is Arda's third consecutive season in the Bulgarian First League. During this season the club will compete for the first time in the UEFA Europa Conference League.

This article shows player statistics and all matches (official and friendly) that the club played during the 2021–22 season.

Squad

Transfers

In

Out

Loans out

Friendlies

Pre-season

Mid-season

Competitions

Overview

Bulgarian First league

Regular season

Table

Results summary

Results by round

Matches
The league fixtures were revealed on 22 June 2021.

UEFA Conference League Play Offs

Bulgarian Cup

UEFA Europa Conference League

Arda entered the competition in the second qualifying round following their win in the 2020–21 First Professional Football League Europa Conference League play-off.

Second qualifying round

Squad Statistics

Appearances
Players with no appearances not included in the list.

Goalscorers

Top assists
Not all goals have an assist.

Clean sheets

Disciplinary record

Awards

References

Arda
Arda